St. Hippolyte's Priory was a Benedictine priory in the village of Saint-Hippolyte in the Haut-Rhin department, Alsace, France.

It was founded in 760, on an estate then called Audoaldovillare, by Saint Fulrad, a powerful politician, diplomat, landowner and churchman, also abbot of St. Denis' Abbey, who is often said to have been born in Saint-Hippolyte. He also obtained from Pope Stephen II the relics of Saint Hippolytus, after whom the new priory was named, and in due course also the village.

St. Hippolyte's was at first a cell of Lièpvre Priory, founded by Fulrad at the same time, but soon became a priory dependent on the abbey of Saint-Denis.

References
 Baquol, Jacques, 1865 (reprint 1976): L'Alsace ancienne et moderne ou dictionnaire topographique, historique et statistique du Haut-Rhin et du Bas-Rhin (3rd edition, revised by Paul Ristelhuber). Salomon, np 
 Aubé, Jean-Paul: Saint-Hippolyte au XVIe et XVIIe siècle d'après les archives conservées à Nancy in Ducs de Lorraine: territoires et possessions (Revue d'Alsace, 2003), p. 155-193
 Fleckenstein, Josef, 1957: Fulrad von Saint-Denis und der fränkische Ausgriff in den süddeutschen Raum in G. Tellenbach, Studien und Vorarbeiten zur Geschichte des fränkischen und frühdeutschen Adels, p. 9-39. Freiburg-im-Breisgau

Buildings and structures in Haut-Rhin
Benedictine monasteries in France
8th-century establishments in Francia
Christian monasteries established in the 8th century
Churches completed in 760